Pleasant Gap is an unincorporated community in southeastern Bates County, in the U.S. state of Missouri. The community is on Missouri Route 0 approximately ten miles southeast of Butler.

History
Pleasant Gap was laid out in about 1840. It was so named from its scenic setting in a gap. A post office called Pleasant Gap was established in 1840, and remained in operation until 1918.

References

Unincorporated communities in Bates County, Missouri
Unincorporated communities in Missouri